Groszkowo  is a village in the administrative district of Gmina Purda, within Olsztyn County, Warmian-Masurian Voivodeship, in northern Poland. It is located in Warmia.

A historical wayside shrine from the 18th century is located in Groszkowo.

References

Groszkowo